The Jameh Mosque of Lar was built by the Safavid dynasty and is located in Larestan County, south of Fars Province.

References

Mosques in Iran
Mosque buildings with domes
National works of Iran
Lar